Tsunenori is a masculine Japanese given name.

Possible writings
Tsunenori can be written using different combinations of kanji characters. Here are some examples: 

常則, "usual, rule"
常紀, "usual, chronicle"
常憲, "usual, constitution"
常徳, "usual, benevolence"
常典, "usual, law code"
常法, "usual, method"
恒則, "always, rule"
恒紀, "always, chronicle"
恒憲, "always, constitution"
恒徳, "always, benevolence"
恒典, "always, law code"
恒法, "always, method"
庸則, "common, rule"
庸紀, "common, chronicle"
庸憲, "common, constitution"
庸徳, "common, benevolence"
毎則, "every, rule"
毎紀, "every, chronicle"
毎憲, "every, constitution"

The name can also be written in hiragana つねのり or katakana ツネノリ.

Notable people with the name
, Japanese actor and model.
, Japanese politician.
, Japanese prince and general.
, Japanese kugyō.
, Japanese general.
, Japanese politician.

Japanese masculine given names